Chasing the Moon may refer to:

 Chasing the Moon (1922 film), a lost silent drama film
 Chasing the Moon (TV series), a 2019 documentary